Epirrhoe molluginata is a moth of the family Geometridae. It is found from the southern part of central Europe to the Caucasus.

The wingspan is about 23–27 mm. Adults are on wing from May to July.

The larvae feed on Galium species, including Galium mollugo and Galium sylvaticum. The species overwinters as a pupa.

References

External links

Lepiforum.de
schmetterlinge-deutschlands.de

Moths described in 1813
Epirrhoe
Moths of Europe
Moths of Asia
Taxa named by Jacob Hübner